Minoo Khaleghi is an Iranian jurist and reformist activist. In the 2016 parliamentary elections, Khaleghi won a seat, however she was disqualified by the Guardian Council after the election.

Background 
Khaleghi was born in 1985, in Isfahan. She comes from a well-known family, whose uncle –Nasser Khaleghi– served in the Cabinet of President Mohammad Khatami. A graduate of University of Isfahan and Allameh Tabataba'i University in Law, she is now a PhD Candidate at Islamic Azad University's Isfahan Science and Research Branch. Her fields of expertize include public and communications law. She has been a journalist in local media and an activist in local non-governmental organizations with a focus on women's rights and environmentalism. Khaleghi is also a member of "natural resources and climate change committee", Chamber of Commerce, Industries, Mines & Agriculture—Isfahan.

2016 election
Backed by the moderate–reformist List of Hope, she received the third-highest vote in Isfahan County and was elected as a member of the parliament. In an interview with the Financial Times, she said her aim is "to fight for the rights of women who head families and increase the support they get from the law".

The election results were as follows:

Disqualification 
On 20 March 2016, the last day of the Iranian calendar year, right before Nowruz, the Guardian Council ruled that Minoo Khaleghi couldn’t take her seat because her votes are “null and void”, and didn’t give a reason for ruling her out. In an open letter, Khaleghi said she had not met any council members in the days prior to or following the election, and she rejected “boundless rumors” which questioned her “dignity and character” as a Muslim. According to rumors quoted in multiple Iranian sources, she was disqualified because of an alleged photo of her without wearing hijab, or shaking hands with a non-mahram man.

On 15 May 2016 Abbas Jafari Dowlatabadi, the prosecutor general of Tehran, said she has been summoned to the court to "explain about charges against her".

See also
Alireza Rajaei
Khaled Zamzamnejad
Beytollah Abdollahi

References

Living people
Politicians from Isfahan
1985 births
Iranian reformists
University of Isfahan alumni
Islamic Azad University alumni
Iranian jurists
21st-century Iranian women politicians
21st-century Iranian politicians
Iranian elected officials who did not take office